Trilok Kapoor (11 February 1912  23 September 1988) was an Indian actor and a member of the Kapoor family who worked in Bollywood films. He was the younger brother of actor Prithviraj Kapoor.

Early and personal life
Trilok was born as the second son of Dewan Basheshwarnath Kapoor in a Punjabi Hindu family. Like his brother Prithviraj Kapoor he entered the budding Hindi film industry (Bollywood) in the 1930s and was one of the most commercially successful actors of the era. Born in Peshawar, he moved to Calcutta and then to Mumbai.  His bungalow in Union Park, Chembur, is one of the last remaining bungalows in the area, now renamed Trilok Kapoor Marg.

Kapoor had 2 sons, Vicky Kapoor and Vijay Kapoor.

Vicky Kapoor was a lawyer & politician and Vijay Kapoor was a film director [2].

Career
His first role was the lead in the blockbuster Char Darvesh (1933) opposite Kanan Devi. 
He played the role of Luv in the 1933 classic hit Seeta directed by Debaki Bose. The film also starred Prithviraj Kapoor as Rama, Gul Hamid as Laxman, and Durga Khote as Sita.

Trilok Kapoor became a prominent lead actor of the 1930s and 1940s and was one of the highest paid film star for several years.

He acted as hero opposite Noor Jehan in the superhit film Mirza Sahiban, her last film in India in 1947 before Noor Jehan moved to Pakistan.
He was often paired as hero opposite leading actresses of the era such as Nalini Jaywant, Sushila Rani Patel, Meena Shorey, Sulochana and others.

He was paired with Nargis in the superhit movie Pyar ki Baatein.

Later he transitioned to mythological films. He played the role of Rama in Homi Wadia’s 1948 film Shri Ram Bhakta Hanuman and Shiva in Vijay Bhatt's 1954 epic Ramayan. He played many roles in mythological films, and appeared together with Nirupa Roy in eighteen movies, usually he playing Shiva and she Parvati. As a pair, their popularity erupted after the 1950 movie Har Har Mahadev which was the highest-grossing film of the year. 
He starred in the 1955 film Ekadashi as a hero opposite Mala Sinha. He was the lead in Nanabhai Bhatt’s blockbuster film Ram Janma (1951). He played the role of lord Vishnu in the superhit 1955 film Waman Avtar with Nirupa Roy and Shahu Modak which had the hit song Tere Dwar Khada Bhagwan penned by Kavi Pradeep.
Devotional songs from his films are very popular till date like “Bholenath se Nirala (Har Har Mahadev), Tere Dwar Khada Bhagwan” (Waman Avtar), and “Pinjare ka panchi” (Naag Mani).
He also produced a movie Shiv Parvati under his banner TK Films in 1962 in which he played the role of Shiva opposite Ragini who played Parvati and Jeevan who played the role of Narad Muni.

Later he switched to playing character roles through the 1970s until his death in 1988. His notable films were Kachche Dhaage, Chor Chor, Darwaza, Saboot, Purana Mandir, Ram Teri Ganga Maili among others.
His last film was the 1988 telefilm Akaanksha directed by his son Vijay Kapoor

Filmography

References

External links

Punjabi Hindus
20th-century Indian male actors
Indian male silent film actors
Indian male film actors
People from Faisalabad
Male actors from Mumbai
Trilok
Punjabi people
1988 deaths
1912 births